Matúš Paločko (born 23 December 1990) is a Slovak professional ice hockey player currently playing for HK Dukla Michalovce of the Slovak Extraliga.

Career statistics

Regular season and playoffs

References

External links

 

Living people
Slovak ice hockey forwards
1990 births
HK Poprad players
HC Prešov players
HC Stadion Litoměřice players
HK Spišská Nová Ves players
MHk 32 Liptovský Mikuláš players
HK Dukla Michalovce players
Sportspeople from Poprad
Slovak expatriate ice hockey players in the Czech Republic